Deanna Michaux (born April 8, 1970 in North Carolina) is a nationally syndicated columnist, author and radio host. Michaux is the author of the advice column and radio show "Ask Deanna!". She appeared in the 2006 race relations documentary Black.White. with Ice Cube on the F/X channel. She is a direct descendant of Oscar Micheaux, one of the first African American playwrights who also has a star on the Hollywood Walk of Fame.

References

External links 
 

American advice columnists
American women columnists
Writers from North Carolina
American talk radio hosts
American women radio presenters
1970 births
Living people
20th-century American women writers
21st-century American women writers